In functional analysis and related areas of mathematics, an almost open map between topological spaces is a map that satisfies a condition similar to, but weaker than, the condition of being an open map. 
As described below, for certain broad categories of topological vector spaces,  surjective linear operators are necessarily almost open.

Definitions

A surjective map is called an  if it is open at every point of its domain, while it is called an  each of its fibers has some point of openness. 
Explicitly, a surjective map  is said to be  if for every  there exists some  such that  is open at  

Almost open linear map

this article will not use this definition.

If a linear map  is almost open then because  is a vector subspace of  that contains a neighborhood of the origin in  the map  is necessarily surjective. 
For this reason many authors require surjectivity as part of the definition of "almost open". 

If  is a bijective linear operator, then  is almost open if and only if  is almost continuous.

Relationship to open maps

Every surjective open map is an almost open map but in general, the converse is not necessarily true. 
If a surjection  is an almost open map then it will be an open map if it satisfies the following condition (a condition that does  depend in any way on 's topology ): 
If the map is continuous then the above condition is also necessary for the map to be open. That is, if  is a continuous surjection then it is an open map if and only if it is almost open and it satisfies the above condition.

Open mapping theorems

Theorem: If  is a surjective linear operator from a locally convex space  onto a barrelled space  then  is almost open.

Theorem: If  is a surjective linear operator from a TVS  onto a Baire space  then  is almost open.

The two theorems above do  require the surjective linear map to satisfy  topological conditions.

See also

 
 
 
 
 
 
 
  (also known as the Banach–Schauder theorem)

References

Bibliography

  
  
  
   
  
  
  
  
  
  

Topological vector spaces